Dilke is a village in the Canadian province of Saskatchewan within the Rural Municipality of Sarnia No. 221 and Census Division No. 6.

History 
Dilke incorporated as a village on December 30, 1912.

Demographics 

See also 

 List of communities in Saskatchewan
 Villages of Saskatchewan
 Dilke

References

Villages in Saskatchewan
Sarnia No. 221, Saskatchewan
Division No. 6, Saskatchewan